Ancharius griseus is a species of catfish of family Anchariidae. It inhabits the Onilahy River basin of western Madagascar.  A. griseus reaches about  SL.

See also
 Ancharius (fish)
 Ancharius fuscus

References

griseus
Fish described in 2005